Newcastle United F.C. is an English men's professional association football club

Newcastle United may also refer to:

 Newcastle KB United, a defunct Australian men's association football club
 Newcastle Rosebud United, former name used by Adamstown Rosebuds FC, an Australian men's semi-professional association football club in Northern NSW
 Newcastle United, the original name of Newcastle West A.F.C., an Irish men's semi-professional association football club
 Newcastle United Jets FC, an Australian men's professional association football club
 Newcastle United Jets FC W-League, an Australian women's semi-professional association football club
 Newcastle United W.F.C., an English women's semi-professional association football club
 Newcastle United F.C., former name of Gibraltarian semi-professional association football club Lincoln Red Imps F.C.

See also 
 Newcastle F.C., an intermediate association football club in Northern Ireland